Kembo may refer to:

Jirès Kembo Ekoko (born 1988), retired professional footballer
Kembo Uba Kembo (1947–2007), Congolese football midfielder
Paul Kipkosgei Kembo (born 1990), Turkish long distance runner of Kenyan origin
Richard Kembo, Papua New Guinea rugby league footballer
Kembo Kibato (born 2000), Canadian professional soccer player
Kembo Mohadi (born 1949), former Vice-President of Zimbabwe